Jan Franciszek Adametz was a Polish printer of 18th century Wrocław.

He printed for the magazine Schlesischer Nouvellen Courier in the years 1736-1741, previously issued by his father in law, Karl Leopold Bachler. In times of Prussian rule as a result of conflicts with the censors he did not obtain the privilege of publishing grace and had to leave the city.

References

Polish printers
Businesspeople from Wrocław
18th-century Polish–Lithuanian businesspeople